Kaniadakis statistics (also known as κ-statistics) is a generalization of Boltzmann-Gibbs statistical mechanics, based on a relativistic generalization of the classical  Boltzmann-Gibbs-Shannon entropy (commonly referred to as Kaniadakis entropy or κ-entropy). Introduced by the Greek Italian physicist Giorgio Kaniadakis in 2001, κ-statistical mechanics preserve the main features of ordinary statistical mechanics and have attracted the interest of many researchers in recent years. The κ-distribution is currently considered one of the most viable candidates for explaining complex physical, natural or artificial systems involving power-law tailed statistical distributions. Kaniadakis statistics have been adopted successfully in the description of a variety of systems in the fields of cosmology, astrophysics, condensed matter, quantum physics, seismology, genomics, economics, epidemiology, and many others.

Mathematical formalism 

The mathematical formalism of κ-statistics is generated by κ-deformed functions, especially the κ-exponential function.

κ-exponential function 

The Kaniadakis exponential (or κ-exponential) function is a one-parameter generalization of an exponential function, given by:

 

The κ-exponential for  can also be written in the form:

 

Basic properties

The κ-exponential function has the following properties of an exponential function:
 
 
 
 
 
 
 
For a real number , the  κ-exponential has the property:
 .

κ-logarithm function 
  
The Kaniadakis logarithm (or κ-logarithm) is a relativistic one-parameter generalization of the ordinary logarithm function,  
 

 
The κ-logarithm for  can also be written in the form:

following the rule 

Basic properties

The κ-logarithm function has the following properties of a logarithmic function:
 
 
 
 
 
 
 
For a real number , the  κ-logarithm has the property:

κ-Algebra

κ-sum 
 ,
that can also be written in form:
 ,
where the ordinary sum is a particular case in the classical limit : .   

The κ-sum, like the ordinary sum, has the following properties:
 
 
 
 

The fundamental property  arises as a special case of the more general expression below: 

Furthermore, the κ-functions and the κ-sum present the following relationships:

κ-product 
 ,
where the ordinary product is a particular case in the classical limit : . 

The κ-product, like the ordinary product, has the following properties:
 
 
 
 

The κ-sum  and the κ-product  obey the distributive law: .

The fundamental property  arises as a special case of the more general expression below:

 

 Furthermore, the κ-functions and the κ-product present the following relationships:

κ-Calculus

κ-Differential
 .

So, the κ-derivative of a function  is related to the Leibniz derivative through:
 ,
where  is the Lorentz factor. The ordinary derivative  is a particular case of κ-derivative  in the classical limit .

κ-Integral
The Kaniadakis integral (or κ-integral) is the inverse operator of the κ-derivative defined through
 ,
which recovers the ordinary integral in the classical limit .

κ-Trigonometry

κ-Cyclic Trigonometry

The Kaniadakis cyclic trigonometry (or κ-cyclic trigonometry) is based on the κ-cyclic sine (or κ-sine) and κ-cyclic cosine (or κ-cosine) functions defined by:  
 ,
 ,
where the κ-generalized Euler formula is
 .

The κ-cyclic trigonometry preserves fundamental expressions of the ordinary cyclic trigonometry, which is a special case in the limit κ → 0, such as:
 
 .

The κ-cyclic tangent and κ-cyclic cotangent functions are given by:
 
 .

The κ-cyclic trigonometric functions become the ordinary trigonometric function in the classical limit .

κ-Inverse cyclic function

The Kaniadakis inverse cyclic functions (or κ-inverse cyclic functions) are associated to the κ-logarithm:
 ,
 ,
 ,
 .

κ-Hyperbolic Trigonometry
The Kaniadakis hyperbolic trigonometry (or κ-hyperbolic trigonometry) is based on the κ-hyperbolic sine and κ-hyperbolic cosine given by:  
 ,
 ,
where the κ-Euler formula is
 .

The κ-hyperbolic tangent and κ-hyperbolic cotangent functions are given by:
 
 .

The κ-hyperbolic trigonometric functions become the ordinary hyperbolic trigonometric functions in the classical limit .

From the κ-Euler formula and the property  the fundamental expression of κ-hyperbolic trigonometry is given as follows:
 

κ-Inverse hyperbolic function

The Kaniadakis inverse hyperbolic functions (or κ-inverse hyperbolic functions) are associated to the κ-logarithm:
 ,
 ,
 ,
 ,
in which are valid the following relations:
 ,
 ,
 .
The κ-cyclic and κ-hyperbolic trigonometric functions are connected by the following relationships:
 ,
 ,
 ,
 ,
 ,
 ,
 ,
 .

Kaniadakis entropy 

The Kaniadakis statistics is based on the Kaniadakis κ-entropy, which is defined through:  
 

The Kaniadakis κ-entropy is thermodynamically and Lesche stable and obeys the Shannon-Khinchin axioms of continuity, maximality, generalized additivity and expandability.

Kaniadakis distributions 

A Kaniadakis distribution (or κ-distribution) is a probability distribution derived from the maximization of Kaniadakis entropy under appropriate constraints. In this regard, several probability distributions emerge for analyzing a wide variety of phenomenology associated with experimental power-law tailed statistical distributions.

κ-Exponential distribution

κ-Gaussian distribution

κ-Gamma distribution

κ-Weibull distribution

κ-Logistic distribution

Kaniadakis integral transform

κ-Laplace Transform 

The Kaniadakis Laplace transform (or κ-Laplace transform) is a κ-deformed integral transform of the ordinary Laplace transform. The κ-Laplace transform converts a function   of a real variable   to a new function  in the complex frequency domain, represented by the complex variable . This κ-integral transform is defined as:

The inverse κ-Laplace transform is given by:

Properties

The κ-Laplace transforms presented in the latter table reduce to the corresponding ordinary Laplace transforms in the classical limit .

κ-Fourier Transform 
The Kaniadakis Fourier transform (or κ-Fourier transform) is a κ-deformed integral transform of the ordinary Fourier transform, which is consistent with the κ-algebra and the κ-calculus.  The κ-Fourier transform is defined as:

which can be rewritten as

The kernel of the κ-Fourier transform is given by:

The inverse κ-Fourier transform is defined as:

Let , the following table shows the κ-Fourier transforms of several notable functions:

The κ-deformed version of the Fourier transform preserves the main properties of the ordinary Fourier transform, as summarized in the following table. 

The properties of the κ-Fourier transform presented in the latter table reduce to the corresponding ordinary Fourier transforms in the classical limit .

See also 

 Giorgio Kaniadakis
 Kaniadakis distribution
 Kaniadakis κ-Exponential distribution
 Kaniadakis κ-Gaussian distribution
 Kaniadakis κ-Gamma distribution
 Kaniadakis κ-Weibull distribution
 Kaniadakis κ-Logistic distribution
 Kaniadakis κ-Erlang distribution

References

External links
Giorgio Kaniadakis Google Scholar page
Kaniadakis Statistics on arXiv.org

Statistical mechanics